Nergården or Nergård is a village in the northern part of Harstad Municipality in Troms og Finnmark county, Norway.  The village was the administrative centre of the former municipality of Bjarkøy until 2013 when it was merged into Harstad.  It is located on the eastern part of the island of Bjarkøya.  The historic Bjarkøy Church is located in the village.

References

Bjarkøy
Villages in Troms